The Santa Maria Addolorata Cemetery ("Cemetery of Our Lady of Sorrows"; formerly Italian: Cimitero di Santa Maria Addolorata), often known simply as the Addolorata Cemetery, is a state owned Neo-Gothic cemetery located in Paola, Malta. It is a multi-faith cemetery, but predominantly characterized by Catholic burials. It is the largest burial ground in the country and has been expanded a number of times. People of all social background are buried within the cemetery, and it consists from temporary memorial plaques of the death (which are removed over time) to permanent monuments including chapels belonging to private families. The cemetery also includes Commonwealth War graves.

History
The cemetery was built between 1862 and 1868 on a hill known as Tal-Ħorr (formerly Tal Palma in Italian) in which was already a burial ground since prehistoric times. The cemetery and the chapel were built in a neo-gothic design based on designs by the architect Emanuele Luigi Galizia. It was opened on May 9, 1869. Nonetheless, the first burial took place on January 23, 1872. This cemetery is full of old Mausoleums and statues in marble and bronze. The cemetery was further extended in the 1970s.

The cemetery contains 277 identified interments and commemorations of military personnel killed in the country in World War I and World War II. Many graves are marked by Commonwealth War Graves Commission (CWGC) gravestones.

The language used in the tombstones is Italian until 1934, then mainly English. In more recent gravestones, the most frequently used language is Maltese.

Chapel

The iconic neo-gothic Chapel of Our Lady (formerly in Italian: Cappella della Beata Vergine Addolorata) is the centre of attraction within the whole complex. The cemetery is built around the chapel, which lies on the highest part of the hill. Its spire is visible from miles away above the surrounding trees. The care of the non-denominational chapel was in the hands of the Franciscan Capuchins until 2010.

References

External links

Paola, Malta
Cemeteries in Malta
Catholic cemeteries in Europe
Gothic Revival architecture in Malta
Buildings and structures completed in 1869
1869 establishments in Malta
Commonwealth War Graves Commission cemeteries in Malta